The Roy and Leola Gangware House, is a historic house in Multnomah County, Oregon, United States, just outside the Portland municipal boundary. It is listed on the National Register of Historic Places.

See also
 National Register of Historic Places listings in Multnomah County, Oregon

References

1932 establishments in Oregon
Houses completed in 1932
Houses in Multnomah County, Oregon
Houses on the National Register of Historic Places in Oregon
National Register of Historic Places in Multnomah County, Oregon
Tudor Revival architecture in Oregon
Portland Historic Landmarks